Elmer Diedtrich (March 31, 1927 – February 19, 2013) was an American politician and businessman.

Born in Glencross, South Dakota, Diedtrich served in the United States Navy during World War II following graduation from Bowdle High School. He graduated from Northern State University and owned an insurance business. Diedtrich served in the South Dakota House of Representatives 1989–1992 and 1996–2000 and in the South Dakota State Senate 2001–2002. He died at Mercy Medical Center in Williston, North Dakota.

Notes

1927 births
2013 deaths
People from Dewey County, South Dakota
Northern State University alumni
Businesspeople from South Dakota
Republican Party members of the South Dakota House of Representatives
Republican Party South Dakota state senators
21st-century American politicians
20th-century American politicians
20th-century American businesspeople
21st-century American businesspeople
American businesspeople in insurance